Volkovo is a town in the municipality of Gjorče Petrov, North Macedonia. It is located on the northwestern outskirts of Skopje.

Demographics
According to the 2002 census, the village had a total of 6750 inhabitants. Ethnic groups in the village include:

Macedonians 6187
Bosniaks 1
Serbs 429
Romani 45
Aromanians 5
Others 83

References

External links

Villages in Ǵorče Petrov Municipality